

Wilson River Bridge, also known as Wilson River Bridge at Tillamook or Wilson River Bridge No. 01499, is a bridge near Tillamook, Oregon, United States. The 1931 bridge was designed by Conde McCullough in the Classical Revival and Art Deco styles.

According to the Historic American Engineering Record description:

It was listed on the National Register of Historic Places in 2005.

See also

List of bridges documented by the Historic American Engineering Record in Oregon
List of bridges on U.S. Route 101 in Oregon
List of bridges on the National Register of Historic Places in Oregon

Further reading

References

External links

Image of Wilson River Bridge from the Construction Innovation Forum

Road bridges on the National Register of Historic Places in Oregon
Neoclassical architecture in Oregon
Bridges completed in 1931
Transportation buildings and structures in Tillamook County, Oregon
Tied arch bridges in the United States
Art Deco architecture in Oregon
Historic American Engineering Record in Oregon
Bridges by Conde McCullough
National Register of Historic Places in Tillamook County, Oregon
1931 establishments in Oregon
U.S. Route 101
Bridges of the United States Numbered Highway System
Concrete bridges in the United States